Saint Thomas Parish may refer to:

Saint Thomas Parish, Barbados
Saint Thomas Parish, Jamaica

Parish name disambiguation pages